"Can You Feel" is a song by Australian rock band Taxiride. It was released as the band's third single from their debut album, Imaginate, in January 2000, becoming the band's third top-40 single.

Track listing
Australian maxi-single
 "Can You Feel" – 3:15	
 "The Burden" – 3:06	
 "Sydney" – 3:02	
 "Can You Feel" (Leigh Brothers Remix) – 3:30	
 "Can You Feel" (Dan Chase Remix) – 6:24

Charts

References

1999 songs
2000 singles
Taxiride songs
Song recordings produced by Jack Joseph Puig
Warner Records singles